Rhomboteuthis lehmani is an extinct species of squid, currently the only described member of its genus. R. lehmani is known from the Lower Callovian (165–164 Ma) of Voulte-sur-Rhône, Ardèche, France.

Radiography was used to locate the position of the ink sac and gladius (pen) of the pictured specimen.

References
 Fischer, J.-C. & B. Riou 1982. Les teuthoïdes (Cephalopoda, Dibranchiata) du Callovien inférieur de la Voulte-sur-Rhône (Ardèche, France). Annales de Paléontologie 68(4): 295–325.
 Fischer, J.-C. 2003. Invertébrés remarquables du Callovien inférieur de la Voulte-sur-Rhône (Ardèche, France). Annales de Paléontologie 89: 223–252.

Jurassic cephalopods
Squid
Fossils of France